The Temple of Jupiter is a colossal Roman temple, the largest of the Roman world, situated at the Baalbek complex in Heliopolis Syriaca (modern Lebanon). The temple served as an oracle and was dedicated to Jupiter Heliopolitanus.

It is not known who commissioned or designed the temple, nor exactly when it was constructed. Work probably began around 16 BC and was nearly complete by about AD 60. Cultic activity had long taken place at the site; the temple presumably replaced an earlier one, possibly using the same foundation.

It was the biggest temple dedicated to Jupiter in all the Roman Empire. The columns were 19.9 meters high with a diameter of nearly 2.5 meters: the biggest in the classical world. It took three centuries to create this colossal temple complex.

History

The huge quarry nearby likely played into the Roman decision to create a huge "Great Court" of a big pagan temple complex in this mountain site, despite being located at 1,145 meters of altitude and lying on the remote eastern border of the Roman Empire.

Although the 6th-century Greek historian John Malalas dates the temple to the reign of Antoninus Pius (AD 138–161),  construction probably started soon after , when Baalbek became a Roman colony known as Colonia Julia Augusta Felix Heliopolitana. It was largely completed by AD 60 as evidenced by a graffito located on one of the topmost column drums. It was an important religious site during the Roman Empire, and emperors often consulted the temple's oracle. Trajan learned of his imminent death .

The temple complex is on a raised plaza erected  over an earlier T-shaped base consisting of a podium, staircase, and foundation walls. These walls were built from about 24 monoliths, at their lowest level weighing approximately 300 tonnes each. (A fourth, still larger stone called the Stone of the Pregnant Woman lies unused in the nearby quarry  from the town and weighs around 1,000 tonnes. A fifth, weighing approximately 1,200 tonnes lies in the same quarry.) Through the foundation there run three enormous passages the size of railway tunnels.

A wide staircase provided access to the elevated platform, which measured  on top. The Temple of Jupiter proper was circled by a peristyle of 54 unfluted Corinthian columns: ten in front and back and nineteen along each side. The columns were 19.9 meters high, the tallest of any classical temple, and the apex of the pediment is estimated to have been 44 meters above the floor of the court. With a rectangular footprint of 88 by 44 meters, it is considerably smaller than earlier Greek temples, such as the Temple of Artemis at Ephesus and the Temple of Apollo at Didyma. Rather its significance lies in the sophistication of its planning and architectural detail.

A number of Julio-Claudian emperors enriched the temple's sanctuary in turn. In the mid-1st century, Nero built the tower-altar opposite the temple. In the early 2nd century, Trajan added the temple's forecourt, with porticos of pink granite shipped from Aswan at the southern end of Egypt.

The Temple-Sanctuary of Heliopolitan Zeus was ruined by earthquakes, destroyed and pillaged for stone under Theodosius and again under Justinian: eight columns were taken to Constantinople (Istanbul) for incorporation into the Hagia Sophia. Three columns fell during the late 18th century.

Construction
The original method of construction remains an archeological mystery.

This quarry was slightly higher than the temple complex, so no lifting was required to move the stones.

Individual Roman cranes were not capable of lifting stones in the 60 to 100 tonne range, but a special one could have been built only for this temple.

The large stones may have probably been rolled into position along temporary earthen banks from the quarry or multiple cranes may have been used in combination, or they might have alternated sides a little at a time, filling in supports underneath each time.

Continued archaeological investigations have been hindered by civil unrest in the region.

Function
Macrobius, writing c. 400, says that the temple held a golden statue of Apollo or Zeus. Represented as a beardless youth and in the garb of a charioteer, his right hand held a whip, the left a lightning bolt and ears of corn.

Present condition

At present, six columns remain standing along its south side with their entablature.

Their capitals remain nearly perfect on the south side, while the Beqaa's winter winds have worn the northern faces almost bare.

Gallery

See also
 Roman Phoenicia
 Temple of Bacchus
 1st century in Lebanon
 2nd century in Lebanon
 4th century in Lebanon

Notes

Footnotes

Bibliography

 .
 .
 .
 .
 
 Lyttelton, Margaret (1996). "Baalbek", in The Dictionary of Art, 34 volumes, edited by Jane Turner. New York: Grove. . 
 

Roman sites in Lebanon
Temples of Jupiter
1st-century religious buildings and structures
Destroyed temples
Temples in Lebanon